During the 1992–93 English football season, Millwall F.C. competed in the Football League First Division.

Season summary
In the 1992–93 season, Millwall's hopes of possible promotion were promising and at one stage where in 3rd place by the end of February but from the end of March until the end of the season, the Lions won only one of their final nine league games and as a result finished six points outside the play-off places in 7th place. This was also Millwall's final season at The Den before moving to The New Den in May 1993.

Final league table

Results
Millwall's score comes first

Legend

Football League First Division

FA Cup

League Cup

Anglo-Italian Cup

Squad

References

Millwall F.C. seasons
Millwall